Port an Eòrna is the Scottish Gaelic name for the small settlement of Barleyport, situated almost midway between Plockton and the Kyle of Lochalsh, in Ross-shire, Scotland, in the Western Highlands. Port an Eòrna was once a fishing community near Duirinish, an area of common grazing for sheep and Highland cattle. Now it is a cluster of a few houses on National Trust for Scotland land. Port an Eòrna is a natural sandy beach. Eòrna means "barley" in Scottish Gaelic.

It has views across to the Cuillin on the Isle of Skye, as well as of Loch Carron, to the Applecross Peninsula. Duirinish, the home community for Port an Eòrna, is also the home of a Belgian artist who has made her home in this community.

External links
http://www.plockton.com/village/duirinish.shtml

Populated places in Lochalsh